The 2015 WTA Tour was the elite professional tennis circuit organised by the Women's Tennis Association (WTA) for the 2015 tennis season. The 2015 WTA Tour calendar comprises the Grand Slam tournaments (supervised by the International Tennis Federation (ITF), the WTA Premier tournaments (Premier Mandatory, Premier 5, and regular Premier), the WTA International tournaments, the Fed Cup (organized by the ITF), and the year-end championships (the WTA Finals and the WTA Elite Trophy). Also included in the 2015 calendar is the Hopman Cup, which is organized by the ITF and does not distribute ranking points.

Schedule
This is the complete schedule of events on the 2015 calendar, with player progression documented from the quarterfinals stage.
Key

January

February

March

April

May

June

July

August

September

October

November

Statistical information
These tables present the number of singles (S), doubles (D), and mixed doubles (X) titles won by each player and each nation during the season, within all the tournament categories of the 2015 WTA Tour: the Grand Slam tournaments, the year-end championships (the WTA Tour Championships and the Tournament of Champions), the WTA Premier tournaments (Premier Mandatory, Premier 5, and regular Premier), and the WTA International tournaments. The players/nations are sorted by: 1) total number of titles (a doubles title won by two players representing the same nation counts as only one win for the nation); 2) cumulated importance of those titles (one Grand Slam win equalling two Premier Mandatory/Premier 5 wins, one year-end championships win equalling one-and-a-half Premier Mandatory/Premier 5 win, one Premier Mandatory/Premier 5 win equalling two Premier wins, one Premier win equalling two International wins); 3) a singles > doubles > mixed doubles hierarchy; 4) alphabetical order (by family names for players).

Key

Titles won by player

Titles won by nation

Titles information
The following players won their first main circuit title in singles, doubles, or mixed doubles:

The following players defended a main circuit title in singles, doubles, or mixed doubles:

Top 10 entry
The following players entered the top 10 for the first time in their careers:

WTA rankings
These are the WTA rankings of the top 20 singles players, doubles players, and the top 10 doubles teams on the WTA Tour, at the current date of the 2015 season. Players with a gold background qualified for the WTA Finals.

Singles

Doubles

Number 1 ranking

Prize money leaders

Statistics leaders

Points distribution 
The points distribution was mostly the same for the 2015 season. Main draw rounds usually give a little less points, but there is no change for the champion (W). Points for qualifying rounds (Q) have changed in both directions depending on the tournament category. Points earned in 2014 retain their value until they expire after 52 weeks. What changed are the distribution of points for the WTA Finals and WTA Elite Trophy.

* Assumes undefeated Round Robin match record.

WTA fan polls

Player of the Month

Shot of the Month

Retirements 
Following is a list of notable players (winners of a main tour title, and/or part of the WTA rankings top 100 (singles) or (doubles) for at least one week) who announced their retirement from professional tennis, became inactive (after not playing for more than 52 weeks), or were permanently banned from playing, during the 2015 season:

Comebacks 
Following are notable players who will come back after retirements during the 2015 WTA Tour season:

Awards

See also

WTA Tour
2015 ATP World Tour
2015 WTA 125K series
Women's Tennis Association
2015 ITF Women's Circuit
2015 Fed Cup
2015 WTA Finals

References

External links
WTA Tour's 2015 match-facts statistics
WTA Tour Calendar 2015
Women's Tennis Association (WTA) official website
International Tennis Federation (ITF) official website

 
WTA Tour seasons
Wta Tour